Nepalese Muslims (Nepali Musalman) are Nepalis who follow Islam. Their ancestors arrived in Nepal from different parts of South Asia, Central Asia and Tibet during different epochs, and have since lived amidst the numerically dominant Hindus and Buddhists. About 97% of the Muslim community live in the Terai region, while the other 4% are found mainly in the city of Kathmandu and Gorkha and the western hills. The community numbers 971,056, about 3.8% of the total population of Nepal. Districts with large Muslim population include Sarlahi (9.9%), Rautahat (17.2%), Bara (11.9%), and Parsa (17.3%) in the central Terai region bordering the Indian state of Bihar, Kapilbastu (16.8%) and Banke (16%) in the western Terai and Siraha (7%) and Sunsari (10%) and Saptari (10%) eastern Terai Gorkha (2.8%) hill.

History 
Muslims have lived in Nepal for long period of time and have shared common historical experiences with the Hindu majority, and as such have developed a stronger identification with the Nepali state. However, the Terai Muslims, on the other hand, like other Terai communities, also continue to have strong ties across the border and receive cultural sustenance from the larger Muslim population of Uttar Pradesh and Bihar. Historians believe that the first Muslims settled in Kathmandu during King Ratna Malla's reign in the late 15th century. These Muslims were Kashmiri merchants that were given permission by Ratna Malla to settle in Kathmandu. 

The Chaubise rajas of west Nepal also employed Afghan and Indian Muslims to train Nepali soldiers to use firearms and ammunition. Ratna Malla's envoy to Lhasa invited Kashmiri Muslims to Kathmandu in an attempt to profit from the rugs, carpets, shawls and woollen goods they traded between Kashmir, Ladakh and Lhasa. The first batch of Muslims came with a Kashmiri saint who built the first mosque, Kashmiri Taquia, in 1524, writes Shamima Siddika in her book Muslims of Nepal.

Influenced by the system of Mughal courts in Delhi, the Mallas also invited Indian Muslims to work as courtiers and counsellors-leading to rivalry with Newar nobles of the Malla courts. While the Muslim courtiers did not last long and returned to India, other Muslims stayed on. The Mallas also got Indian Muslims from the Mughal Empire to join their courts as musicians and specialists on perfumes and ornaments. Historian Baburam Acharya believes they were also there to protect King Ratna Malla from rebellious relatives and senior court officials.

Following Nepal's unification, King Prithvi Narayan Shah also encouraged Muslim traders to settle down with their families. Besides trade, the Muslims from Afghanistan and India were experts in manufacturing guns, cartridges and canons, while others were useful in international diplomacy because of their knowledge of Persian and Arabic.

Many Muslims, especially Kashmiri traders, are said to have fled to India during the economic blockade that Prithvi Narayan Shah imposed on the Valley. Fearing persecution from a Hindu king due to their religion and their ties with the Mallas, the traders left despite assurances that they would come to no harm. By 1774, only a handful of Kashmiri merchants remained. Even so, Kashmiri traders proved to be a great help during the unification process. Historians say that Prithvi Narayan Shah employed them as spies and informants as they had personal contacts with the Malla rulers. After his victory, he gave them permission to build a mosque, now near Tri-Chandra Campus (Nepali Jame Masjid, Ghantaghar).

During Jang Bahadur Rana's regime, a large number of Muslims migrated to the tarai from India fleeing persecution by the British army during the Sepoy Mutiny in 1857. These refugees settled in the Terai region, selling leather goods or working as agricultural labourers. A senior courtier to the Mughal Emperor Bahadur Shah Zafar also fled to Kathmandu. Later, he renovated the Jama Masjid and was buried there. During the Sepoy Mutiny, Begum Hazrat Mahal, wife of Nawab Wajid Ali Shah of Lucknow also escaped to Kathmandu via Nepalganj and was allowed by Jang Bahadur to take refuge in Nepal. She settled down at the Thapathali Durbar and later died in Kathmandu and was also buried at the Nepali mosque.

Classification 

The history of the Muslim community in Nepal is in fact the history of three distinct groups, the Tibetans,Hindustani, Kashmiris and the Madhesi.

Kashmiri Muslims 

According to the Vamshavalis, Kashmiri Muslims arrived in Kathmandu during the reign of King Rama Malla (1484-1520 AD). They built a mosque, the Kashmiri Takia, and engaged in different occupations such as scribes to correspond with the Delhi Sultanate, and as scent manufacturers, musicians and bangle suppliers. Some were admitted as courtiers to the Malla durbar, and many traded with Tibet. The descendants of these migrants live in Kathmandu, numbering about two thousand. They tend to be well-educated and speak a mixture of Nepali and Urdu at home rather than Kashmiri. Many Kashmiri Muslims of Kathmandu are also fluent in Newari. While many work as businessmen, some have joined government service or entered politics.

Tibetan Muslims 

Muslim migrants of Tibetan origin include both Ladakhis and those from Tibet proper. The latter arrived mostly after the Chinese Communist takeover in 1959, and in their language and dress these Tibetan Muslims are indistinguishable from their Tibetan Buddhist counterparts. Today, many are engaged in the trade of Chinese consumer durables and selling curios. On the whole, this groups tends to be more affluent than the other Muslim communities.

The story of the Tibetan Muslims is that of a unique community, that has blended different cultural strains to forge a distinct identity, that has been kept alive even in the face of adversity. According to the community's traditions, Islam arrived almost a thousand years ago in Tibet, a region that has always been synonymous with a monolithic Buddhist culture. Sometime in the 12th century, it is believed, a group of Muslim traders from Kashmir and Ladakh came to Tibet as merchants. Many of these traders settled in Tibet and married Tibetan women, who later converted to the religion of their husbands. Author Thomas Arnold, in his book, The Preaching of Islam says that gradually, marriages and social interactions led to an increase in the Tibetan Muslim population until a sizable community came up around Lhasa, Tibet’s capital.

Madhesi Muslims 

While the smaller groups provide diversity, the largest community of Islam adherents, more than 74 percent—of the Muslims are found in the Madhesh region, a narrow Terai plain lying between the lower hills of the Himalaya and the border with India. Concentrated in the Madhesh districts of Banke, Kapilvastu, Rupandehi, Parsa, Bara and Rauthat, some of the Madhesi Muslims were present here at the time of Nepal´s unification while others migrated from India, Pakistan, Afghanistan, Turkey, Arabia, Tibet, Egypt from the 19th century onwards as wage labourers. While most are small-time proprietor farmers, a substantial number still work as tenants and agricultural labourers. At home they do speak Urdu, but also Awadhi, Bhojpuri and Maithili & Nepali depending on whether they are of the Western or Central or Eastern Madhesh.

The Muslim society in the Madhesh (Terai) region is organized along the principles of caste, but differs in many respects from the caste system found among the Madhesi Nepali Hindus. Although Muslim groupings are endogamous, and there are elements of hierarchy, there are no religious and ideological principles providing a foundation for the concept of caste. For example, there is no question of ritual pollution by touch or restriction on interdining. But each grouping does maintain a separate and distinct identity, especially with regard to intermarriage. Below is a brief description of the larger groupings:

Members of Madhesh-based Muslim communities reside in the Kathmandu valley and are the leaders of a revival and reform of Islam informed by global Islamist discourses and enabled and promoted by petrodollars and new technologies of communication linking them with Muslims communities around the world. The movement has both religious and political dimensions (though the two intertwine significantly in Islam), each represented by distinct organizations with their internal hierarchies and rules for membership. They provide scholarships for Muslim youth, support for mosques and madrases, and religious trainings. These organizations have centers in the Terai as well, but the national centers are in the Kathmandu valley. Their ideological influences range from the Muslim Brotherhood, to Salafism, to the Jamaat-e Islami.

See also 
 Islam in Nepal
 Newar Islam

External links 
 A minority within a minority: Nepal’s Tibetan Muslims mark Ramadan
 A Refugee’s Ramadan
 Nepalese Muslim Society elects new working committee

References 

 
Ethnic groups in Nepal